The Cameo of the Yellowstone is a 1914 American silent short Western film directed by Sidney Ayres starring William Garwood and Harry De Vere.

Cast
 William Garwood   
 Harry De Vere  
 Louise Lester   
 Joseph Melville   
 George Morrison   
 Jack Richardson   
 Vivian Rich  
 Harry von Meter

External links
 

1914 films
1914 Western (genre) films
American silent short films
American black-and-white films
Silent American Western (genre) films
1910s American films
1910s English-language films